Maj may refer to:
 Major, a rank of commissioned officer in many military forces
 Máj, a romantic Czech poem by Karel Hynek Mácha
 Máj (literary almanac), a Czech literary almanac published in 1858
 Marshall Islands International Airport

People 
 DJ Maj, American Christian music DJ
 Fabio Maj (born 1970), Italian cross country skier
 Maj Bylock (1931–2019), Swedish writer, translator, teacher
 Maj Sjöwall (born 1935), Swedish author and translator
 Maj Sønstevold (1917–1996), Swedish composer
 Maj Helen Sorkmo (born 1969), Norwegian cross country skier
 Maj Britt Theorin (1932–2021), Swedish social democratic politician and diplomat
 Paulina Maj-Erwardt (born 1977), Polish volleyball player
 Acronym for Muhammad Ali Jinnah (1876–1948), Founder of Pakistan